Drachiella is a genus of crabs in the family Aethridae, containing one fossil species, and the following species:
 Drachiella aglypha (Laurie, 1906)
 Drachiella angulata (Ihle, 1918)
 Drachiella caelata Takeda & Tachikawa, 1995
 Drachiella lapillula (Alcock, 1896)
 Drachiella morum (Alcock, 1896)
 Drachiella sculpta (Haswell, 1879)

References

Crabs